WISEPA J031325.96+780744.2 (designation abbreviated to WISE 0313+7807, or WISE J0313+7807) is a brown dwarf of spectral class T8.5, located in constellation Cepheus at approximately 21 light-years from Earth.

Discovery
WISE 0313+7807 was discovered in 2011 by J. Davy Kirkpatrick et al. from data, collected by Wide-field Infrared Survey Explorer (WISE) Earth-orbiting satellite — NASA infrared-wavelength 40 cm (16 in) space telescope, which mission lasted from December 2009 to February 2011. In 2011 Kirkpatrick et al. published a paper in The Astrophysical Journal Supplement, where they presented discovery of 98 new found by WISE brown dwarf systems with components of spectral types M, L, T and Y, among which also was WISE 0313+7807.

Distance
Currently the most accurate distance estimate of WISEPA J031325.96+780744.2 is a trigonometric parallax, published in 2019 by Kirkpatrick et al.: 134.3 ± 3.6 mas, corresponding to  pc, or  ly.		

The best estimate is marked in bold.

Notes

References

Brown dwarfs
T-type stars
Cepheus (constellation)
WISE objects